City Girl is a 1930 American silent film directed by F. W. Murnau, and starring Charles Farrell and Mary Duncan. It is based upon the play "The Mud Turtle" by Elliot Lester. Though shot as a silent feature, the film was refitted with some sound elements and released in 1930. The film is credited as being the primary inspiration for Terrence Malick's film Days of Heaven (1978).

Plot

In the years of the Great Depression, Lem Tustine is sent to Chicago by his father to sell the family farm's wheat crop. He meets Kate, a waitress who is sick of the endless bustle of the city and has dreams of living in the countryside. The stock market price of wheat starts to drop and Lem hurriedly sells the crop for far less than the bottom line his father had given him.

Meanwhile, Lem has fallen in love with Kate and they marry. They travel back to the countryside, but Lem's father, angry at the disastrous wheat sale, subjects Kate to hostility and physical abuse, mistakenly believing that she is simply after Lem's money. Lem fails to stand up to his father in support of Kate and the relationship appears doomed. Matters are made worse when a group of farm hands arrive to help with the wheat harvest and one of them - Mac - tries to woo Kate away. Lem's father interprets Mac's unwanted attentions as evidence of Kate's wanton nature and swears to break Lem and Kate apart.

When reports of a hurricane destroying the country's wheat crops arrives, Lem's father tries to get the crop in early by working through the night. In an attempt to gain Kate's affections Mac calls a strike to sabotage the harvest. Lem, reading a farewell letter from Kate, realizes that his own lack of action has caused all the misery, and finally responds. He fights with Mac, berates his father and then goes searching for Kate. The workers abandon Mac and return to finish the harvest. Lem and Kate talk and finally agree to try again. Lem's father begs forgiveness from Kate as the film ends.

Cast

Production
City Girl was shot on location in Athena and Pendleton, Oregon. According to research by film historians, a farm was constructed for the making of the film.

According to a newspaper article in the Heppner Gazette-Times on the arrival of Murnau and actress Mary Duncan in Pendleton, the film's original working title was Our Daily Bread. Upon her arrival to shoot the film in August 1928, Duncan was granted the Round-Up Queen of the 1928 Pendleton Round-Up rodeo.

The Fox Film studios for whom Murnau was working were subject to a takeover during filming. The new owners requested a number of changes to City Girl, including the addition of sound sequences which Murnau resisted, and eventually he walked away to begin filming Tabu, A Story of the South Seas. The sound version of City Girl was released but flopped at the box office and has since been lost.

Rediscovery
The silent version film was among those rescued from the Fox vaults in 1970 by Eileen Bowser of Museum of Modern Art and screened at the museum.

References

External links

 

1930 films
American silent feature films
Films directed by F. W. Murnau
1930 drama films
American black-and-white films
Silent American drama films
Films produced by William Fox
Films shot in Oregon
Fox Film films
Films with screenplays by Berthold Viertel
1930s American films